The  ( or ) was a military hospital located at  in the 5th arrondissement of Paris, France. It was closed as a hospital in 2016.

History
After the birth of her son Louis XIV, Anne (previously childless after 23 years of marriage) showed her gratitude to the Virgin Mary by building a church on the land of a Benedictine convent.

Construction began in 1645, and was completed in 1667.

As a result, the church's exquisite interior is one of the few unspoiled remnants of Paris's pre-Revolution grandeur. Following the Revolution, the buildings were converted into a military hospital.

Currently, the original buildings only serve for offices and teaching facilities; the actual medical facilities are inside a large modern building to the east on the same grounds.

The present-day hospital was built in the 1970s and completed in 1979. It has a capacity of 350 beds, in various specialties. The hospital is accessible to military personnel in need of medical aid as well as to any person with health coverage under the French social security system. It is famous for being the place where the top officials of the French Republic generally get treated for ailment.

The old abbey alongside the church is now a museum of French army medicine.  Tours of the museum and church are available for a small fee (being a military facility, the grounds are under military guard and tourists are escorted).  Cameras are not permitted except for inside the church itself.

The last emperor of Vietnam, died at  hospital on 30 July 1997, aged 83.

People buried at Val-de-Grâce
 was later the traditional burial place for members of the House of Orléans, cadet of the House of Bourbon:

  (1693–94), daughter of Philippe II, Duke of Orléans
 Louis, Duke of Orléans (1703–52)
 Margravine Auguste of Baden-Baden,  (1704–26)
 , Mademoiselle (1726–28), daughter of the above who died in childbirth giving birth to Louise Marie
  (1725–85), son of Louis
  (1726–59), wife of the above

Impact on the arts

As a part of the French government's efforts to keep morale up during the war, a museum of reconstructive surgery was built in the hospital. The exhibits consisted of wax sculptures of deformed human faces and the results of reconstructive surgery. A look at the museum reveals that there is almost no doubt that the exhibits influenced the two artists and eventually the surrealist movement, which frequently deals with themes of dismemberment and disfigurement. The hospital was featured in the motion picture "Lucy" starring Scarlett Johansson. (https://www.imdb.com/title/tt2872732/locations)

Gallery

See also
 French Defence Health service
 List of hospitals in France

References

External links

 Photos of the church interior

Buildings and structures in the 5th arrondissement of Paris
Christian monasteries in Paris
Hospital buildings completed in the 17th century
Hospital buildings completed in 1979
Hospitals in Paris
Military hospitals in France
Hospitals established in 1796
Defunct hospitals in France